This is the discography of German Eurodisco group Dschinghis Khan, also known as Genghis Khan.

Albums

Studio albums

Compilation albums

Singles

Notes

References

Discographies of German artists
Disco discographies
Pop music group discographies